Adam Sandler is an American actor, comedian, producer, singer and writer.

Film

Television

References

External links 
 

Male actor filmographies
American filmographies
Filmography